Elani is a Kenyan African pop group from Nairobi. It consists of three members; Wambui Ngugi, Brian Chweya and Maureen Kunga. The trio released their debut single"Jana Usiku" in November 2013 that became a great success, paving way for their subsequent singles. In 2014, the trio released numerous singles in the making of their debut album Barua ya Dunia.

History

2008 – 12; Band maturity 
Elani met in January 2008 at Alliance Française in Nairobi. It originally consisted of four members; Wambui Ngugi, Maureen Kunga, Brian Chweya and Daniel Kimani.  Kimani's departure has never been explained. They became more serious between 2010 and 2011 when they mutually decided to take their careers to the next level.

2013  – Present; Barua ya Dunia 
In 2013, the band released their debut single "Jana Usiku" In March 2014, Elani released their second single "Milele", the song talks about two lovers who live a forbidden passion, thereby the lady's family tries hard to marry  her off to a doctor. The video was shot by Sauti Sol's Savara Mudigi in conjunction with Sol Music Entertainment and directed by Enos Olik. In mid 2014, the trio released "Kookoo", a song that was shot in the streets of Nairobi, and is the most successful production the band ever released since it was the most downloaded song in the downloading platforms. As of 16 July 2014, "Kookoo" was ranked second in the respective week's chart just coming right after Bahati's "Barua". The band has also released "hatua",  "Zuzu", "Uko Wapi", "Barua ya Dunia" and "Mahindi. In 2016, the band featured Chameleone in their new single "My Darling".

Controversies 
On 12 January 2016, Elani released a statement through their YouTube channel and their other social media platforms, accusing the Music Copyright Society of Kenya(MCSK) of corruption over music royalty disparity. Having paid them KES 31,000 for their royalties for television and radio air play. They later stated, that after addressing their complaints to the relevant authorities of the society, Brian, one of the band members was called by the society's offices and paid a compensatory KES 300,000, making the motive behind the two payments questionable. MCSK later defended itself stating that all said by the band is not entirely true but accepted the fact that the band was paid peanuts but they (MCSK) later discovered a mistake on their (MCSK) part where they failed to monitor the band's songs for the period dated July 2013 to June 2014. Adding that  KES 300,000 was compensation for the royalties lost within that period for which their song received massive airplay finalizing that that is a common mistake that happens not only to Elani but also other musicians.

Band members 

Current members 
 Wambui Ngugi  – Vocals (2008 –present)
 Maureen Kunga  – Vocals (2008 –present) 
 Brian Chweya  – Vocalist, guitarist (2008 –present)

Previous members
 Daniel Kimani

Personal Lives

Maureen Kunga 
Kunga is a law school graduate (University of Nairobi) and an Advocate of the High Court of Kenya

Wambui Ngugi 
Ngugi is an Actuarial Science graduate (University of Nairobi).

Brian Chweya 
Chweya is a law school graduate (University of Nairobi) and an Advocate of the High Court of Kenya.

Discography

Studio albums 

Barua ya Dunia

Singles

Awards and nominations

References

External links 
Elani at SoundCloud
Barua ya Dunia in iTunes

Kenyan musical groups
Musicians from Nairobi
Musical trios
Musical groups established in 2008